Roy W. Simonson (September 7, 1908 – November 2, 2008) was a scientist, professor, and writer who studied soil across the United States and on islands in the Western Pacific. He taught at Iowa State College from 1938 to 1943 and then became a Soil Correlator for the United States Department of Agriculture Division of Soil Survey. After World War II, Simonson worked for the Military Geology Unit to map soils on islands in the Western Pacific. Simonson spent the rest of his career at the Division of Soil Survey until his retirement in 1973. In his retirement, he occasionally taught courses on soil genesis as a visiting professor at the University of Maryland until relocating to Oberlin, Ohio, in 1993.

Roy Simonson was born to Norwegian immigrants (Otto & Johanna Simonson) on September 7, 1908 on a farm in Agate, North Dakota 16 miles from the Canadian border. He was the second of eight children. He attended high school in Bisbee at age 11. In 1926, Simonson attended North Dakota Agricultural College in Fargo to study engineering, later switching to agriculture in 1929. He studied soils under Charles E. Kellogg and helped map the soils of McKenzie County, ND summer, 1932. He earned his Bachelor of Science in Soils and Chemistry in 1934, and then studied at the University of Wisconsin, where he received his doctorate in Soil Science in 1938.

After serving as an Assistant Professor of Soils at Iowa State College from 1938–1942,  he worked in the USDA federal soil survey programs, first with the Bureau of Chemistry and Soils and then with the Soil Conservation Service.  He served as Principal Soil Correlator for the Southern United States, Chief Soil Scientist for Pacific Surveys, 1947–48; Assistant Chief of Soil Surveys, 1949–52; and Director for Soil Classification and Correlation, 1953–1971.

Simonson resided in Hyattsville, MD for much of his career, where he was recruited by soil professors at the University of Maryland to volunteer with teaching and research programs.  Simonson gave numerous lectures and seminars on soil science at the university.  He would present an annual two hour “soils of the world” lecture, on soils of the (then) 10 orders of Soil Taxonomy, to the annually taught soil morphology, genesis and classification class (AGRO 414, now NRSC 414).  For these lectures he utilized his vast collection of 35mm slides of soil profiles and landscapes – taken during his professional travels around the world.

In 1967 Simonson became the editor-in-chief of soil science journal Geoderma where he published numerous articles.

He was inducted into the Mid-Atlantic Association of Professional Soil Scientists (MAPSS) in 1989 as its first honorary member.

Published works 

 Six Months Along the Missouri (2004)
 Letters, Letter Segments, and Memoirs from a Farm (2005)
 Concept of Soil 
 Historical Highlights of Soil Survey and Soil Classification with Emphasis on the United States, 1899–1970 (1989)

References 

University System of Maryland faculty
1908 births
2008 deaths
Iowa State University faculty
United States Department of Agriculture people
American soil scientists
North Dakota State University alumni
People from Rolette County, North Dakota
People from Towner County, North Dakota
 University of Wisconsin–Madison College of Agricultural and Life Sciences alumni
American people of Norwegian descent
20th-century American scientists
Scientists from North Dakota